Nils Slaatto (June 22, 1922 – March 16, 2001) was for more than two decades one of Norway's most prominent and influential architects, having a strong and distinctive impression on Norwegian architecture. Slaatto cooperated with Kjell Lund in an architectural firm partnership for many years.

Background
Nils Slaatto was born in the town of Lillehammer in Oppland, Norway.  His father, Oddmund Eindride Slaatto, was a functionalist architect in Oslo in the years between the two world wars.  His mother, Anine Wollebæk,  was also an architect, graduating from the University of Technology, but never practised.

During 1938-39 Nils Slaatto took carpentry at the Technical School in Oslo before he enrolled in the Norwegian Institute of Technology, Faculty of Architecture, where he graduated in 1947. The post-war period offered numerous tasks; the most demanding was the rebuilding of northern Norway, where Slaatto participated in the reconstruction of Finnmark as district architect in Vadsø and Tana from 1948 to 1950. Large parts of the area suffered major damage during the war because of the Germans' use of the scorched-earth tactic.

Career
In 1957 Nils Slaatto and Kjell Lund, a fellow graduate from the Norwegian Institute of Technology,  were invited to take part in a limited competition for an extension to the Akershus County Agricultural College at Hvam.  In 1958, after winning the competition, they were able to start their architectural firm Lund & Slaatto Arkitekter AS, a partnership that lasted for three decades. As youngsters, Slaatto and fellow Lillehammer native, Lund, had both wandered around Maihaugen, an open-air museum consisting of many types of old wooden farm buildings They were influenced by this Norwegian wood architecture, adapting age-old techniques to modern production demands.  An example is the "Ål cabin" in the Hallingdal Valley, designed in cooperation with Jon Haug. 

The architectural firm of Lund & Slaatto was awarded the Houen Foundation Award for three of their designs: 
St. Hallvard's Church and Monastery at Enerhauggata in Oslo,  DNV GL headquarters at Høvik in Bærum, and St. Magnus Catholic Church at Romeriksgata in Lillestrøm.

Personal life
In 1949 Slaatto married Margit Bleken of Trondheim, the sister of the famous Norwegian artist Håkon Bleken. When they moved to Oslo, Slaatto started as the leader of the Farmers' Architectural Office.

Selected works
 1964 	-	Asker Town Hall in Akershus
 1966	-	St. Hallvard's Church and Monastery in Oslo 
 1971	-	Det Norske Studentersamfund - Chateau Neuf in Oslo
 1975 - St. Hallvard's Church and Monastery at Enerhauggata in Oslo 
 1988- DNV GL headquarters  at Høvik in Bærum  
 1991 - St. Magnus Catholic Church at Romeriksgata in Lillestrøm

Achievements
 1962–63 	Vice Chairman Oslo Architects' Association
 1968–70 	Vice-President National Federation of Norwegian Architects
 1965–70 	Member of editorial staff Bonytt
 1968–70	Member of the board of the national Federation of Norwegian Applied Art
 1965–68 Lecturer at the School of Architecture in Oslo
 1965–68 Lecturer at the Faculty of Architecture, Norwegian University of Technology
 External examiner, lecturer and consultant for new appointments at the Architectural College
 Member of the jury for Norwegian and Scandinavian architecture competitions
1968 — Pispala district, Tampere, Finland
1980 — Music and Conference Centre, Pori, Finland
1985 — Copenhagen Harbour, Denmark
1988 — U.L.T. Newspaper/Publishing building, Västerås, Sweden

References

Other sources on Lund & Slaatto
Grønvold, Ulf (1988) Lund & Slaatto  (Universitetsforlaget (1988) 
Moe, Ingvild Simers (2006) Eidsvolls plass og Studenterlunden En studie av byrommets funksjonelle, estetiske og symbolske kvaliteter med utgangspunkt i Lund og Slaattos engasjement på 1970- og 80-tallet  (Masters Theses in Art History at University of Oslo)

External links 
 Lund+Slaatto Arkitekter  Official website(Norwegian)

1920s births
2001 deaths
People from Lillehammer
20th-century Norwegian architects